Innocenzo Chatrian ( - 21 March 1927 – 28 May 2019) was an Italian cross-country skier who competed at 1956 Winter Olympics. He started in two competitions:
 4x10 km (5. place)
 15 km (25. place)

He competed in 30 km competition at Nordic World Ski Championships 1958 where he finished at 39. place. He was born in Torgnon and married in 1960.

References

1927 births
2019 deaths
Italian male cross-country skiers
Cross-country skiers at the 1956 Winter Olympics
Olympic cross-country skiers of Italy
Sportspeople from Aosta Valley